Temur Maghradze Stadium is a multi-use stadium in Chiatura, Imereti region, Georgia.  It is used mostly for football matches and is the home stadium of FC Chiatura. The stadium is able to hold 11,650 people.

See also 
FC Chiatura
Stadiums in Georgia

References

Sports venues in Georgia (country)
Football venues in Georgia (country)
Buildings and structures in Imereti